Mike Schulz (born March 5, 1964) is an American politician who served as a member of the Oklahoma Senate from 2006 to 2018. A farmer from Southwestern Oklahoma, Schulz was first elected to office in 2006.

Early life and education
Schulz was born in Cheyenne, Oklahoma. He attended Oklahoma State University and received a bachelor's degree in agriculture.

Career 
He has worked with several agricultural organizations in Oklahoma, including the Young Farmer and Rancher Committee and the Oklahoma Farm Bureau.

Oklahoma Senate
Mike Schulz first entered Oklahoma politics in May 2006, when he won a Senate seat in a special election. He later served as President pro tempore of the Oklahoma Senate. He was previously the Majority Floor Leader in the Oklahoma Senate. In his position, he serves as an ex-officio member of all Senate committees. In the Senate, he voted to repeal the state's income tax, restrict abortions, as well as prohibit federal health care mandates.

Schulz authored legislation meant to protect Oklahoma agriculture by having the Oklahoma Department of Agriculture regulate livestock as he explained in a 2009 guest column to The Oklahoman.

References

|-

1964 births
21st-century American politicians
Living people
Republican Party Oklahoma state senators
Oklahoma State University alumni
People from Altus, Oklahoma
People from Roger Mills County, Oklahoma